The Division of Chemical Health and Safety (DCHAS) is a technical division of the American Chemical Society (ACS) that focuses on topics of health and safety within the field of chemistry. Founded in 1979 and headquartered in Washington, D.C., DCHAS works with a variety of sister professional organizations including the ACS Committee on Chemical Safety, AIChE's Center for Process Safety, Campus Safety, Health and Environmental Association, and AIHA Laboratory Safety Committee. Membership in the Division of Chemical Health and Safety is intended to give chemical health and safety professionals in the industry, academia and government greater knowledge of applying health and safety principles.

Origins
The Division of Chemical Health and Safety was first proposed at the September 1979 meeting of the American Chemical Society in Washington D.C., where the Committee on Divisional Activities considered elevating the provisional Chemical Health and Safety to full division status. Following much discussion, the recommendation was rejected on a purposed formality. Understanding the importance of division status, Glenn T. Seaborg advocated for the recommendation at the meeting of what was called the Science Commission. Later that year, the Division of Chemical Health and Safety was established.

Mission
The objectives of the Division of Chemical Health and Safety are: 
to promote chemical health and safety.
to provide a forum for discussing laws and regulations relating to chemical health and safety.
to disseminate information on the properties of chemicals which affect health and safety directly or through the environment.
to promote the exchange of scientific information among various disciplines that make up the division.
to work with other ACS divisions and professional societies on issues relating to chemical health and safety.

The division carries out its mission mainly by publishing the Journal of Chemical Health and Safety (JCHAS) and giving technical presentations at ACS National and Regional meetings. In addition, the DCHAS operates an e-mail discussion list to host active exchanges of chemical safety information.

Awards
DCHAS provides several awards recognizing outstanding leadership and service in the area of chemical health and safety, including:
 Howard Fawcett Chemical Health and Safety Award
 Safety Stratus College and University Health and Safety Award
 Tillmanns-Skolnick Award
 CHAS Student Registration Award 
 Laboratory Safety Institute Graduate Research Faculty Safety Award
 Service Awards
 CHAS Fellows Award

References

External links 
 Official website
 Official e-mail discussion list, DCHAS-L

American Chemical Society